Echendu Osita (born 4 February 1987) is a Nigerian professional footballer.

References

External links 
 FIFA.com
 http://www.nigeriafootball.com/playerInfo,348,Echendu-Osita
 http://www.goal.com/en/people/nigeria/69220/osita-echendu

Living people
Association football midfielders
Nigerian footballers
1987 births
Dolphin F.C. (Nigeria) players
Heartland F.C. players
Sportspeople from Kano